Em Família (Helena's Shadow) is a Brazilian primetime telenovela created by Manoel Carlos and produced and broadcast by TV Globo. It premiered on 3 February 2014, replacing Amor à Vida and ended 18 July 2014, replaced by Império.

Julia Lemmertz, Bruna Marquezine and Humberto Martins star as the protagonists, while Vivianne Pasmanter and Gabriel Braga Nunes star as the antagonists.

According to Ibope, the average was 29.63 (30) points - the lowest rated 9PM telenovela of all time.

Plot
Tells the story of two cousins, Helena (Julia Lemmertz) and Laerte (Gabriel Braga Nunes), who grow up united by two strong ties: family and love. Laerte is a musician who is in love with his cousin, but consumed by an obsessive jealousy, especially of his friend Virgílio (Humberto Martins), who has always fostered a platonic love for Helena. Helena herself has a strong personality and has never accepted the possessive side of her problematic boyfriend, although she keeps teasing him.
 
On the night before his marriage to Helena, Laerte argues with Virgílio and strikes him across the face. Taking his rival for dead, Laerte quickly buries the body to hide the evidence. But Virgílio survived the blow and Laerte is taken prisoner at the altar. After he serves his sentence of one year, Laerte moves to Europe and loses contact with the woman who was almost his wife.
 
Twenty years after the tragedy that tore him away from his cousin, Laerte, now a successful musician, sees a young girl in the audience at one of his concerts, who looks just like his long lost love. It is Luiza (Bruna Marquezine), the daughter of Helena, and Laerte’s rival, Virgílio, who still bears the scar on his face and on his soul from that fateful day.
 
Back in Brazil, Laerte sees Luiza again and, to Helena’s deep despair, becomes romantically involved with her. She is now married to Virgílio and she sees history repeat itself with her daughter’s love affair. Dormant feelings resurface and affect both her marriage and her relationship with her daughter. Defying everyone, Laerte and Luiza decide to stay together—a decision that causes conflict and turmoil all around them.

Cast

Ratings

Awards and nominations

International Broadcasting
Globo distributed Em Família for 3 countries to date, with 75 chapters - almost half the original.

References 

2014 telenovelas
Brazilian telenovelas
2014 Brazilian television series debuts
2014 Brazilian television series endings
TV Globo telenovelas
Brazilian LGBT-related television shows
Television shows set in Rio de Janeiro (city)